Marrickville Hospital is a now closed hospital in , a suburb in the Inner West of Sydney, in the state of New South Wales, Australia.

A group to fund the start of the site was begun in 1895. The foundation stone was laid in 1897 with the hospital opening in 1899 as Marrickville Cottage Hospital. In 1899, the hospital proper opened, and was renamed Marrickville District Hospital in 1922. In 1990, the hospital closed, and has remained empty since. In 2015, Marrickville Council released plans to redevelop the hospital site into a residential and commercial development including a new library and 'community hub'.  The council entered into a partnership with real estate group Mirvac to deliver the project. The site is located on the corner of Marrickville and Livingstone roads.

References

Former hospitals in Sydney
1899 establishments in Australia
Hospitals established in 1899
1990 disestablishments in Australia
Hospitals disestablished in 1990